"Victim" was the second single from Eighteen Visions self-titled album. The song was featured as the theme song to WWE Vengeance, and has had much airplay on the radio stations. The CD was not released as a single, but rather as a promo, for radio, and collectors.

Meaning
In this song, James is begging the girl for forgiveness, but she denies it because she feels that she is the victim. James sings as the girl, not as himself.

Charts

Featured on
"Victim" was featured on the popular sportbike freestyle video "Mass Mayhem 3". The song was originally in the Saw III soundtrack but it was instead replaced with "Your Nightmare".

Track listing
"Victim" (2:58)

Video
 The song's music video was shot in the Hewitt residence from The Texas Chainsaw Massacre film.
 The Victim video is also featured on the WWE Vengeance DVD.

References

Eighteen Visions songs
2006 singles
2006 songs
Epic Records singles
Trustkill Records singles